is a poem by Sadako Kurihara written in August 1945 in Hiroshima after the city's atomic bombing. It tells the true story of a woman giving birth to a baby amongst the ruins, while the midwife dies of exhaustion in the process. This poem was first published in March 1946 in Chugoku Shimbun. The baby mentioned in the poem is still living today in Hiroshima, named Kazuko Kojima.

Alternate English titles for the poem are We Shall Bring Forth New Life and Let Us Be Midwives!

References

Japanese poems
Books about the atomic bombings of Hiroshima and Nagasaki
Works originally published in Japanese magazines
Works by Japanese writers
Literature by women